El abrazo ("The Embrace" in Spanish) may refer to:

El abrazo (Jorge González Camarena), a work by Mexican artist Jorge González Camarena
El Abrazo partido or in English Lost Embrace, 2004 Argentine, French, Italian, and Spanish comedy drama film, directed by Daniel Burman
El abrazo de la serpiente or in English Embrace of the Serpent,  2015 Colombian internationally co-produced adventure drama film directed by Ciro Guerra

See also
Abrazo (disambiguation)